Hydriris ornatalis, the ornate hydriris, is a moth of the family Crambidae. It has a wide distribution and is known from southern Europe, Asia, Australia, Africa and North America, where it is restricted to Florida.

The wingspan is about 16 mm.

The larvae feed on Convolvulaceae species, including Ipomoea aquatica.

External links

Bug Guide
Fauna Europaea
Moths and Butterflies of Europe and North Africa

Spilomelinae
Cosmopolitan moths
Moths described in 1832